The Heritage Press is a trade name which has been used by multiple printers and publishers. Most notably, "The Heritage Press" was an imprint of George Macy Companies, Ltd., from 1937 to 1982. The Heritage Press reprinted classic volumes previously published by the more exclusive Limited Editions Club.

History

Original "Heritage Press"

In 1929, George Macy founded the Limited Editions Club and began publishing illustrated books in limited numbers (usually 1500 copies) for subscription members. In 1935 Macy founded the Heritage Club, which together with the Heritage Press,  created and distributed more affordable and unlimited reprints of the great books previously published by The Limited Editions Club.

Macy was involved personally in the work of the Press, designing many of its publications, including The Grapes of Wrath, The Decameron, Hans Christian Andersen's Fairy Tales, and A Shropshire Lad.

He also authored The Collected Verses of George Jester (distributed in a limited number as a Macy family holiday greeting) and edited Heritage's A Sailor's Reader and A Soldier's Reader, which were wartime volumes, published in August 1943,  of "four hundred thousand words of literary entertainment" for members of the American armed services.

Macy also acquired and operated another press publishing limited editions.  In 1936, he became managing director of the Nonesuch Press of London, founded by Francis Meynell.

The Macy family sold their companies in 1970; Heritage Press was later sold to Easton Press.

California "Heritage Press"

In 1973 (following the 1970 acquisition of the original "Heritage Press", by Easton Press), another "Heritage Press" emerged in Signal Hill, California -- a comparatively minor publisher, compared to the original, and operating primarily as an on-demand "full service commercial printer," providing "commercial and security printing," and specializing in "stock certificates, prescription pads, and hit promotional products," though also printing "booklets,... postcards," and various business documents.

During the late-1990's the business merged with two other local printing companies, Masters Printing and Fast Print. The business reports that it has serviced printing customers in several cities in and around Southern California, and customers in ten communities in other states.

Michigan "Heritage Press"
The Tuscola County Advertiser newspaper (Caro, Michigan) has operated a small commercial print shop since its founding 1868. In 1984, it separated its print shop as a separate division, naming it "The Heritage Press." It subsequently added branches in Seneca, South Carolina and Riverton, Wyoming.

British (Islamic) "Heritage Press"
In June 2013, in the United Kingdom, another "Heritage Press" was founded as a publishing
house. Its stated objective is to support "revival of the traditional Islamic sciences" and to distribute English-language "authentic, classical and contemporary texts [translated] into... English..." by "scholars... past and present" who have studied "mainstream Sunni orthodoxy."

Publications

Publications of the Heritage Press covered a broad range of topics,  primarily within the Western canon. Examples included editions of Bulfinch's Age of Fable, Jack London’s The Call of the Wild, Spenser's The Faerie Queene, Robert Louis Stevenson's full The Beach of Falesá, Jules Verne's 20,000 Leagues Under the Sea and Les Miserables. A particularly large and ornate edition includes the complete scripts to all of Gilbert and Sullivan's operas, with an accompanying envelope containing facsimile memorabilia.

Aviation historian John W. Underwood has been among those whose books have been published by "Heritage Press" -- both before the sale of the original "Heritage Press" and after the appearance of the Signal Hill-based "Heritage Press," with those books noted as being from another Southern California city: "Glendale, California."

See also
 Modern Library
 Everyman's Library
 Folio Society
 Easton Press
 Franklin Library

References

Defunct book publishing companies of the United States
Publishing companies established in 1937
American companies established in 1937
Publishing companies disestablished in 1982
1982 disestablishments in the United States